The  1st Moscow Jewish Film Festival is an annual international film festival, which aims to gather in the program features, documentaries, shorts and animated films on the subject of Jewish culture, history and national identity and contemporary problems. The festival was first held in Moscow from 14 to 17 June 2015, at the Jewish Museum and Tolerance Center, the Documentary film center and cinema GUM.

Jury
 Konstantin Fam — film director, producer, screenwriter
 Alexander Boroda — Rabbi, President of the Federation of Jewish Communities of Russia
 Yekaterina Mtsituridze — television presenter, film critic and head of Roskino
 Alexander Kott —  film director, screenwriter, producer
 Ruslan Sorokin — screenwriter, producer

Creators
 CEO and producer — Egor Odintsov
 Program director — Vanya Bowden
 Educational director — Rusina Lekuh
 Producer — Konstantin Fam

Program
Nomination "Jews Today":
 Wake up, O Zion (2013) - United States
 Felix and Meira (2014) - Canada
 Journey Hannah (2014) - Germany, Israel
 Somewhere (2014) - Germany
 Get (2014) - Israel, France, Germany

Nomination "A true story":
 When people die - sing (2014) - Russia, the United States
 Jacob Kreizer. Forgotten General (2015) - Russia
 There will come a night (2014) - Great Britain, Germany, United States, Israel, Denmark, France
 Regina (2013) - Hungary, UK, Germany
 Rachel: Woman marked Air (2013) - the United States, Argentina
 About Susan Sontag (2014) - United States

Nomination "A short story":
 Salome's Nose (2014) - Germany, United States
 End Boulevard (2014) - Germany, USA
 Squirrel and the Penguin (2012) - United Kingdom
 Human Principle (2014) - Germany
 Auschwitz in the head (2013) - Israel, Poland, United Kingdom
 I am Mitzvah (2014) - United States

Out of competition:
 Shoes (2012) - Russia, Poland, Belarus, Czech Republic, France
 The Rabbi's Cat (2011) - France
 Ida (2013) - Poland, Denmark
 Israeli animation Avi Chai Foundation (2014) - Israel

Education
In addition to film screenings educational program was organized in the framework of the festival, consisting of lectures, discussions and debates. The speakers were: Russian philosopher Igor Chubarov, writer Linor Goralik,  researcher of Jewish thought Uri Gershovich, gospel playwright Maria Zielinskaya, historian Sergei Stepanishev and others.

Winners
 Winner in the "Brief" - End Boulevard (2014) 
 The winner in the nomination "The Jews of today" - Somewhere (2014)
 Winner in the category "Certificate" - Documentary Was night (2014)
 Honorary Prize "For outstanding contribution to the development of Jewish cinema in Russia" - Yakov Kaller
 "Special prize of the Jury" - Documentary Regina (2013)

See also
Ekaterinburg Jewish Film Festival

References

External links 
 Official website

Jewish film festivals in Europe
Film festivals in Russia
2015 film festivals
2015 in Russian cinema